Events from the year 1942 in Argentina

Incumbents
 President: Roberto María Ortiz (officially up to June 26), Ramón Castillo (acting up to June 26, officially since then)
 Vice President: Ramón Castillo (up to June 26)

Governors
 Buenos Aires Province: Dimas González Gowland (up to January 7), Rodolfo Moreno (starting January 7)
 Cordoba: Santiago del Castillo
 Mendoza Province: Adolfo Vicchi

Vice Governors
 Buenos Aires Province: vacant (until 7 January); Edgardo J. Míguez (starting 7 January)

Events

January

February

March
 The Concordancia wins the national elections for deputies in most provinces. The Socialist party prevails in Buenos Aires, and the UCR in Corrientes and Tucuman
 Corrientes and Tucuman are intervened

April

May

June
 Roberto Ortiz, ill of diabetes, resigns as president. Ramón Castillo, acting president since 1941, becomes official president.
 The chamber of deputies votes to break relations with Nazi Germany, the chamber of senators does not discuss the project.

July

August
 Gillette and Helena Rubinstein start working in the country

September

October
 The port of Rosario is nationalized
 Gaseoduct La Plata-Buenos Aires

November

December
 Agustín Pedro Justo announces his intention to run for the presidency.

Unknown date

Ongoing
 Argentina keeps a neutral stance in World War II, amid foreign pressure to join the war

Births
January 1 – Lita Stantic, film director, producer and screenwriter
January 22 – Juan Carlos Sarnari, footballer
February 10 – Roberto Aguirre, footballer
February 11 – Horacio Verbitsky, investigative journalist 
February 27 – Miguel Ángel Santoro, footballer
March 4 – Juan Carlos Oleniak, footballer
March 22 – Leo Dan, composer and singer
March 24 – Roberto Lavagna, economist and politician
April 12 – Carlos Reutemann, racing driver and politician
April 27 – Carlos Enrique Gavito, tango dancer
April 29 – Horacio Iglesias, swimmer (died 2004)
May 6 – Ariel Dorfman, Argentine-Chilean novelist, playwright, essayist, academic, and human rights activist
May 13 – Adolfo Bisellach, Olympic fencer
May 18 – Juan Carlos Carone, footballer
May 23 – José Omar Pastoriza, footballer (died 2004) 
May 25 – Marcos Mundstock, musician and comedian
June 11 – Cacho Castaña, singer and actor
June 27 – Jérôme Savary, Argentine-French theatre director and actor (died 2013)
July 10
Francisco Escos, footballer
José Antonio Muñoz, artist
July 19 – Agustín Irusta, footballer
August 7 – Carlos Monzón, boxer (died 1995)
August 13 - Jorge Altamira, politician
September 1 - Daniel Willington, footballer
September 8 -  Marcelo Sánchez Sorondo, Roman Catholic bishop
September 25 - Oscar Bonavena, boxer (died 1976)
October 3
Roberto Perfumo, footballer
Margherita Zimmermann, operatic mezzo-soprano
October 8 – María Julia Alsogaray, politician
October 15 – Carlos Núñez Cortés, musician
November 8 – Fernando Sorrentino, writer
November 15 – Daniel Barenboim, pianist and conductor
November 19 – Moris, rock musician
November 27 – Néstor Togneri, footballer (died 1999)
December 9 – Marcos Conigliaro, football player and coach
December 12 – Guillermo Jaim Etcheverry, physician and academic
date unknown 
Pocho Lapouble, jazz musician (died 2009)
Beatriz Sarlo, literary and cultural critic.
Oscar Zarate, comic book artist and illustrator

Deaths
March 23 – Marcelo Torcuato de Alvear, politician (born 1868)
May 3 – Elías Isaac Alippi, actor, director and impresario (born 1883)
June 3 – Vicente Gallo, lawyer, academic and politician (born 1873)
July 15 – Roberto María Ortiz, politician (born 1886; diabetes)
July 20 – Julio Salvador Sagreras, guitarist and composer (born 1879)
July 26 – Roberto Arlt, writer (born 1900)
August 31 – Teddie Gerard, actress and entertainer (born 1890; lung infection)
September 23 – Alfredo Carricaberry, footballer (born 1900)
October 8 – Julio Argentino Pascual Roca, politician and diplomat (born 1873)

See also
List of Argentine films of 1942

Bibliography

References 

 
Years of the 20th century in Argentina